"The Bitterest Pill (I Ever Had to Swallow)" is a single that was released by The Jam in September 1982. It reached number 2 in the UK Singles Chart and remained there for two weeks, unable to dislodge "Eye of the Tiger" by Survivor and "Pass the Dutchie" by Musical Youth from the top spot.

The backing vocals are provided by Jennie Matthias, lead singer of The Belle Stars.

The man on the front cover of this single is Vaughn Toulouse, singer of Department S.

References 

1982 singles
1982 songs
Polydor Records singles
Songs written by Paul Weller
The Jam songs